This is a list of people who have served as Lord Lieutenant of Durham.

Henry Neville, 5th Earl of Westmorland 1552–?
Henry Hastings, 3rd Earl of Huntingdon 2 August 1586 – 1595
vacant
Robert Carr, 1st Earl of Somerset 4 February 1615 – 20 November 1617
Richard Neile, Bishop of Durham 20 November 1617 – 10 December 1627
vacant
John Howson, Bishop of Durham 13 October 1628 – 6 February 1632
Thomas Morton, Bishop of Durham 30 July 1632 – 1642 
Sir Henry Vane 1642 (Parliamentary)
Interregnum
Thomas Belasyse, 2nd Viscount Fauconberg 27 July 1660 – 1661
John Cosin 13 September 1661 – 15 January 1672
In commission 18 April 1672 – 19 November 1674
Charles Howard, 1st Earl of Carlisle
William Widdrington, 2nd Baron Widdrington
Edward Villiers
Sir Christopher Conyers, 2nd Baronet
Sir Ralph Cole, 2nd Baronet
Sir Gilbert Gerard, 1st Baronet
Sir George Vane
Sir James Clavering, 1st Baronet
Henry Lambton
John Tempest
William Blakeston
Cuthbert Carre
Ralph Davison
Sir Francis Bowes
Nathaniel Crew, 3rd Baron Crew, Bishop of Durham 19 November 1674 – 1689
Richard Lumley, 1st Earl of Scarbrough 27 February 1690 – 1712
Nathaniel Crew, 3rd Baron Crew, Bishop of Durham 8 May 1712 – 1714
Richard Lumley, 1st Earl of Scarbrough 16 December 1714 – 17 December 1721
William Talbot, Bishop of Durham 10 January 1722 – 10 October 1730
Edward Chandler, Bishop of Durham 11 December 1730 – 20 July 1750
vacant
Henry Vane, 1st Earl of Darlington 21 March 1753 – 6 March 1758
Henry Vane, 2nd Earl of Darlington 11 July 1758 – 8 September 1792
William Vane, 1st Duke of Cleveland 26 November 1792 – 29 January 1842
Charles William Vane, 3rd Marquess of Londonderry 7 April 1842 – 6 March 1854
George Lambton, 2nd Earl of Durham 31 March 1854 – 27 November 1879
George Vane-Tempest, 5th Marquess of Londonderry 15 January 1880 – 6 November 1884
John Lambton, 3rd Earl of Durham 2 December 1884 – 18 September 1928
Charles Stewart Henry Vane-Tempest-Stewart, 7th Marquess of Londonderry 14 June 1928 – 1949
John Lawson, 1st Baron Lawson 28 April 1949 – 1958
Christopher Vane, 10th Baron Barnard 20 October 1958 – 19 October 1964
Sir James Fitzjames Duff 18 February 1964 – 24 April 1970
John Vane, 11th Baron Barnard 1 October 1970 – 21 April 1988
David James Grant 21 April 1988 – 30 January 1997
Sir Paul Nicholson 30 January 1997 – 7 March 2013
Susan Snowdon 8 March 2013 – present

Deputy lieutenants
A deputy lieutenant of Durham is commissioned by the Lord Lieutenant of Durham. Deputy lieutenants support the work of the lord-lieutenant. There can be several deputy lieutenants at any time, depending on the population of the county. Their appointment does not terminate with the changing of the lord-lieutenant, but they usually retire at age 75.

19th Century
11 April 1831: John Pratt
11 April 1831: Leonard Raisbeck
11 April 1831: Robert Appleby
11 April 1831: William Hodgson
11 April 1831: John Fawcett
11 April 1831: William Mills
11 April 1831: Thomas Greenwell
11 April 1831: George Townshend Fox
14 March 1848: Robert Duncombe Shafto

21st Century
18 June 2015: Dr Jon Levick
18 June 2015: Dame Maura Regan
18 June 2015: Derek Winter
18 June 2015: Lady Sarah Nicholson

References

External links
Official website of the Lieutenancy

Durham